ECPP may refer to:

Elliptic curve primality proving
Environmental Crime Prevention Program